Arthur McRory is a former Gaelic football manager of the Tyrone county team. The Dungannon man was manager on and off for nearly twenty five years, leading Tyrone to their first two periods of relative success - the All-Ireland Finals of 1986 and 1995. Although they never won the All-Ireland under his management, McRory is still regarded as one of the great Tyrone managers, with the county having won an unprecedented five Ulster Senior Football Championship under his guidance (1984, 1986, 1995, 1996, 2001). 

He formed an extremely productive relationship with Eugene McKenna, both when McKenna was a player under McRory, and as a manager alongside him.

He left Tyrone management in 2002, after a disappointing exit in the Championship Qualifiers to an unfancied Sligo, ostensibly due to health concerns, but there is also speculation the parting with the Tyrone County board was acrimonious. This paved the way for his successor, Mickey Harte, who guided Tyrone to three All-Ireland crowns.

He has a keen interest in classical music, and has been seen at operas by sports journalists.

References 

Biography from 2001, prior to Ulster Final

Living people
Gaelic football managers
People from Dungannon
Year of birth missing (living people)